Mario Rabaglino (21 October 1910 - 1991) was an Italian sprinter who was 6th in the 400 m at the 1934 European Athletics Championships.

Biography
Mario Rabaglino, from Turin, immediately after his career as an athlete he embarked on that of architect and during the Second World War, an officer of the Italian army, was taken prisoner by the British in Kenya where he decided to settle once the war was over and where he died in 1991.

Achievements

See also
 Italy at the 1934 European Athletics Championships

References

External links
 Mario Rabaglino at The-Sports.org

1910 births
1991 deaths
Place of death missing
Italian male sprinters
Sportspeople from Turin